Northwood Local Schools is a school district in Northwest Ohio. The school district serves students who live in the cities of Northwood located in Wood County. The superintendent is Jason Kozina.

Current facilities
Northwood High School is the only high school in the district, and handles grades 7-12. Grades PK-6 are handled by Northwood Elementary School.

Former facilities
Lark  Elementary and Olney Elementary were razed 2017, as was the Former Northwood High School Building which closed as a school in 2017 with the opening of the new Northwood Schools Building on the campus.

External links

School districts in Wood County, Ohio